2020 Giro can refer to:

 2020 Giro Rosa, women's cycling stage race in Italy
 2020 Giro d'Italia, men's cycling stage race in Italy
 2020 Giro dell'Emilia, men's cycling one-day race in Italy